M34 or M-34 may refer to:

 M34 (New York City bus) SBS and M34A (New York City bus) SBS, two New York City Bus routes in Manhattan
 M34 grenade
 M34 cluster bomb
 M-34 (Michigan highway), a road in the United States of America
 M34 highway (Tajikistan), a road connecting  Dushanbe and the Anzob Pass 
 M34 (Cape Town), a Metropolitan Route in Cape Town, South Africa
 M34 (Johannesburg), a Metropolitan Route in Johannesburg, South Africa
 M34 (Pretoria), a Metropolitan Route in Pretoria, South Africa
 M34 (Durban), a Metropolitan Route in Durban, South Africa
 Mikulin M-34, the Soviet Union's first indigenous mass-produced liquid-cooled aircraft engine
 Messier 34, an open cluster in the constellation Perseus
 M34 2½ ton cargo truck, a variant of the United States Army M35 2½ ton cargo truck
 M34 (keelboat), a French sailboat design

nl:M34